The Bayer designation f Cygni is shared by two stars in the constellation Cygnus:
f1 Cygni, a Be star
f2 Cygni, a K-type supergiant

Cygni, f
Cygnus (constellation)